John William Pedley (22 August 1882 – 1952) was an English footballer who played in the Football League for Wolverhampton Wanderers. He played in the 1908 FA Cup Final as Wolves beat Newcastle United 3–1, his winners medal was sold at auction in 2008.

References

1882 births
1952 deaths
English footballers
Association football forwards
English Football League players
Wednesbury Old Athletic F.C. players
Wolverhampton Wanderers F.C. players
Wrexham A.F.C. players
FA Cup Final players